Bogdan Marek Pęk (born on 8 April 1953 in Kraków) is a Polish politician and Member of the European Parliament (MEP) for the Lesser Poland Voivodeship & Swietokrzyskie Voivodeship with the League of Polish Families, part of the Independence and Democracy and sits on the European Parliament's Committee on Civil Liberties, Justice and Home Affairs.

Pęk is a substitute for the Committee on Agriculture and Rural Development, a member of the Delegation for relations with the People's Republic of China and a substitute for the Delegation for relations with Belarus.

Education
 1979: Graduate of the Agricultural Academy of Kraków
 1996: Course for members of the Treasury Management Supervisory Councils

Career
 1980–1985: Factory farm manager
 1985–1990: Chairman of the Organisation of Farmers' Cooperatives
 1980–1984: Vice-Chairman of the independent, self-governing trade union NSZZ Solidarność to the Regional Enterprise for the Meat Industry (OPPM)
 1990–1992: Secretary (1990–1992) and Chairman of the Voivodeship Administration of the Polish Peasant Party (PSL) in Kraków
 1996–1997: Vice-Chairman of the National Administration of the PSL
 1988–2003: Member of the High Council of the PSL
 since 2003: Vice-Chairman of the board of the League of Polish Families
 1986–1990: Councillor of the commune ('gmina') of Zielonka
 Member of Parliament of the Republic of Poland
 1993–1994: Chairman of the Committee on Privatisation
 1995–1997: Chairman of the Committee on Inspections
 1997–2001: Vice-Chairman of the Treasury Committee and on affairs of the Institute of National Remembrance
 1997–2003: Vice-Chairman of the PSL Parliamentary Union
 1994: Member of the Polish Angling Association (1970) and the Polish Hunting Association

Decorations
 1986: Bronze Cross of Merit

See also
 2004 European Parliament election in Poland

External links
 
 

1953 births
Living people
Politicians from Kraków
Members of the Polish Sejm 1993–1997
Members of the Polish Sejm 1997–2001
Members of the Polish Sejm 2001–2005
League of Polish Families politicians
Polish Roman Catholics
League of Polish Families MEPs
MEPs for Poland 2004–2009